Quercus delgadoana is an endangered species of oak in the family Fagaceae, found in eastern Mexico. It was originally misidentified as other members of the genus Quercus, but was determined as a new species in 2011.

Description 
These oaks are often among the tallest trees in the wet montane forests. They bear acorns as fruits and have pistillate flowers on a short  stalk, which have 1 or 2 distal flowers.

Quercus delgadoana was determined as a new species because, unlike Q. eugeniifolia with fruit with annual maturation, this species has fruit with biennial maturation. In addition, this new species can be distinguished from other similar species such as Q. laurina and Q. affinis because it has more secondary veins, a revolute blade margin, and an adaxial leaf surface without stellate trichomes.

The flowers may develop in March, but only pistillate flowers can be observed; fruits with biennial maturation can be found in October and November. The fruits take two years to mature and are presented on the terminal twigs.

Taxonomy 
Quercus delgadoana is named after Alfonso Delgado Salinas, in recognition of his contributions to plant taxonomy and the encouragement and training he has given to many students in this field of study. It is placed in Quercus section Lobatae.

Habitat and distribution 
Quercus delgadoana is endemic to the Sierra Madre Oriental, in the states of Hidalgo, Puebla, and Veracruz.

This species is commonly found with many other species of the same genus such as Q. affinis and Q. lancifolia, but is also found with members of different genera such as Fagus grandifolia (North American beech).

Conservation
The species was given a preliminary classification of Endangered (EN) according to the IUCN Red List criteria of 2001. These forests are highly disturbed due to the extraction of firewood, the clearance of forest for pasture, and the establishment of coffee plantations. As a result, more than 50% of the population is expected to decline. In addition, the future loss of habitat is possible.

References

External links
 IUCN Red List of Threatened Species
 New plant and fungus species discovered

delgadoana
Trees of Hidalgo (state)
Trees of Puebla
Trees of Veracruz
Flora of the Sierra Madre Oriental
Cloud forest flora of Mexico
Endemic oaks of Mexico
Plants described in 2011